Caribbean Star Airlines was an airline based in Antigua and Barbuda. It operated scheduled passenger services in conjunction with Leeward Islands Air Transport (LIAT) to destinations in the eastern Caribbean. Its main base was VC Bird International Airport, St John's. The company slogan was A Whole New Altitude.

History
The airline was incorporated in Antigua in January 2000 and started operations with the Dash 8 regional turboprop in June 2000. It was owned by Texan businessman Allen Stanford, through his company Stanford Financial Group. Its sister airline, Caribbean Sun Airlines Inc., launched its maiden flight three years later. The two were affiliated but separate companies.

In January 2007, the airline announced an intended merger with LIAT, and they entered into a commercial alliance, flying a combined schedule. All flights were marketed under LIAT's airline code, although the airlines continued to operate separately using their own air operator certificates until the merger was completed. The merger was finalized on June 15, 2007, with LIAT becoming the surviving carrier.

Destinations

Caribbean Star Airlines operated the following international scheduled services, as of November 2006, until its merger with LIAT:

North America
Caribbean
Antigua
(V.C. Bird International Airport) hub
Barbados
(Grantley Adams International Airport)
British Virgin Islands
Tortola – (Terrance B. Lettsome International Airport)
Dominica –
(Melville Hall Airport)
Guyana
Georgetown – (Cheddi Jagan International Airport)
Grenada
(Maurice Bishop International Airport)
Netherlands Antilles
Curaçao – (Hato International Airport)
Sint Maarten – (Princess Juliana International Airport)
Trinidad & Tobago
Tobago – (Crown Point International Airport)
Port of Spain – (Piarco International Airport)
Saint Kitts & Nevis
St. Kitts – (Robert L. Bradshaw International Airport)
Saint Lucia
Saint Lucia – (George F. L. Charles Airport)
Saint Vincent & the Grenadines
St.Vincent – (E.T. Joshua Airport)

Fleet
The Caribbean Star Airlines fleet consisted of the following aircraft as of March 2007:

11 Bombardier Dash 8 Q300 (Five aircraft transferred to LIAT)

Previously owned aircraft consists of:
3 Bombardier Dash 8 Q100

References

External links
 Caribbean Star Airlines (Archive)

Defunct airlines of Antigua and Barbuda
Latin American and Caribbean Air Transport Association
Airlines established in 2000
Airlines disestablished in 2007